Fallo Arriola (A. 891. XLIV) is a 2009 Supreme Court of Argentina decision which found it unconstitutional to punish personal possession of cannabis by an adult in one's residence. The ruling was made 25 August 2009, declaring unconstitutional Article 14 (second paragraph) of Ley N° 23.737. In 2012, a ruling was expected regarding the national drug laws.

References

2009 in cannabis
Cannabis in Argentina